51st CAS Awards
February 14, 2015

Motion Picture – Live Action: 
Birdman (or The Unexpected Virtue of Ignorance)
Motion Picture – Animated: 
Big Hero 6

The 51st Cinema Audio Society Awards were held on February 14, 2015, in the Bunker Hill Ballroom of the OMNI Los Angeles Hotel at California Plaza, Los Angeles, honoring outstanding achievements in sound mixing in film and television of 2014.

Winners and nominees

11th CAS Technical Achievement Award
 Production: Sound Devices, LLC – Dante and MADI Audio Recorder model 970
 Post-production: iZotope – RX4-Advanced

CAS Honorary Awards
 CAS Student Recognition Awards – Danny Maurer, University of Colorado Denver

References

2014 film awards
2014 guild awards
Cinema Audio Society Awards
2015 in American cinema